Freweyni Hailu (born 12 February 2001) is an Ethiopian middle-distance runner. She placed fourth in the 1500 metres at the 2020 Tokyo Olympics. In 2022, Hailu became the World Indoor silver medallist at the 800 metres in Belgrade.

Career
Freweyni Hailu gained her first international experience in 2018 at the World Junior Championships in Tampere, Finland, where she placed fifth in the women's 800m event.

The next year, she was fourth in the under-20 800m race at the African U18–U20 Championships in Abidjan, Ivory Coast.

Hailu competed in the women's 800 metres at the 2019 African Games, where she was eliminated in the semi-finals.

In June 2021, at the Ethiopian Olympic trials, she ran a personal best in the women's 1500 metres to make the Olympic standard qualifying time for the delayed 2020 Tokyo Olympics. She, Lemlem Hailu, and Diribe Welteji were named to the Ethiopian team. At the Games, she finished in fourth place in a time of 3:57.60 behind only, 1–3, Faith Kipyegon, Laura Muir and Sifan Hassan.

On 14 September 2021, at the Hanžeković Memorial in Zagreb, Hailu set an Ethiopian record for the 2000 metres with a time of 5m 25.86s, finishing behind only Francine Niyonsaba who set in this race a world record of 5:21.56. Hailu's mark was the third-fastest in history.

In March 2022, Hailu won the silver medal in the 800m at the World Indoor Championships in Belgrade with a personal best time of 2:00.54. Ajeé Wilson came first in 1:59.09, and Halimah Nakaayi was third (2:00.66). It was the first global medal at the indoor 800m for the Ethiopian women in history.

Competition record

Circuit wins
 Diamond League
 2021 (1500m): Lausanne Athletissima

Personal bests
 800 metres – 1:57.57 (Chorzów 2021)
 800 metres indoor – 2:00.46 (Karlsruhe 2023)
 1500 metres – 3:56.28 (Monaco 2021)
 1500 metres indoor – 4:02.50 (Toruń 2022)
 2000 metres – 5:25.86 (Zagreb 2021)

References

2001 births
Living people
Olympic athletes of Ethiopia
Ethiopian female middle-distance runners
Athletes (track and field) at the 2020 Summer Olympics
World Athletics Indoor Championships medalists
21st-century Ethiopian women